John Barnes (born 1963) is a Jamaican-born English international former professional footballer and manager.

John Barnes may also refer to:

Entertainment
 John Barnes (film producer) (1920–2000), American producer, director, and writer
 John Barnes (film historian) (1920–2008), British film historian
 John Barnes (musician) (born 1932), English jazz saxophonist and clarinettist
 John Barnes (author) (born 1957), American science fiction author

Law
 Gorell Barnes, 1st Baron Gorell or John Gorell Barnes (1848–1913), British lawyer and judge
 John Barnes (judge) (1859–1919), Wisconsin Supreme Court judge
 John P. Barnes (1881–1959), U.S. federal judge

Military
 John Barnes (British Army officer) (1746–1810), army officer and politician
 John Sanford Barnes (1836–1911), United States Navy officer
 John Andrew Barnes III (1945–1967), United States Army Medal of Honor recipient

Politics
 John Barnes (mayor) (1817–1889), mayor of Dunedin, New Zealand
 John R. Barnes (1833–1919), member of the Utah State Senate
 John Barnes (New South Wales politician) (1838–1915)
 J. Mahlon Barnes (1866–1934), American trade union functionary and activist
 John Barnes (Australian politician) (1868–1938), union official and federal politician
 John Francis Barnes (1904–1952), Australian politician
 John Barnes Jr. (born 1931), member of the New Hampshire Senate
 John E. Barnes Jr. (born 1958), member of the Ohio House of Representatives

Sports
 John Barnes (manager) (1855–1929), Irish minor league baseball manager
 John Barnes (Australian cricketer) (1916–2011), Australian cricketer
 John Barnes (English cricketer) (1897–1945), English cricketer
 John Barnes (Irish cricketer) (1916–1943), Irish cricketer
 John Barnes (athlete) (1929–2004), American  middle-distance runner
 John Barnes (Scottish broadcaster) (born c. 1960), Scottish sports commentator
 John Barnes (Australian footballer) (born 1969), Australian rules footballer
 John Barnes (outfielder) (born 1976), American baseball outfielder
 John Barnes (catcher) (1903–1972), American baseball catcher in the Negro leagues

Other people
 John Barnes (monk) (died 1661), Benedictine monk
 John Arundel Barnes (1918–2010), Australian and British social anthropologist
 John Barnes (computer scientist) (fl. 1970s–2010s), programming language designer
 John Barnes, 5th Baron Gorell (born 1959), British chartered surveyor
 John H. Barnes, American architect

Other uses
 John Barnes (department store), a department store in London

See also
 Jack Barnes (disambiguation)
 Johnnie Barnes (born 1968), American football player
 Johnny Barnes (1923–2016), Bermudian eccentric
 Jonathan Barnes (disambiguation)
 John Spencer-Barnes (born 1961), English radio broadcaster and journalist for the BBC

Barnes, John